Leposoma sinepollex is a species of lizard in the family Gymnophthalmidae. It is endemic to Brazil. It has lanceolate ventral and elongate dorsal scales arranged in diagonal rows. Males of this species have black pigmentation in their ventral parts, while females have a creamy pigmentation.

References

Leposoma
Reptiles of Brazil
Endemic fauna of Brazil
Reptiles described in 2013
Taxa named by Miguel Trefaut Rodrigues
Taxa named by Mauro Teixeira Jr.
Taxa named by Renato Recoder
Taxa named by Francisco Dal Vechio
Taxa named by Roberta Damasceno
Taxa named by Kátia Cristina Machado Pellegrino